Xyleutes poam is a moth in the family Cossidae. It is found in Mexico.

References

Zeuzerinae
Moths described in 1918